Lieutenant General William Henry Harrison Morris Jr. (March 22, 1890 – March 30, 1971) was a senior United States Army officer who fought in both World War I and World War II.

Early life and military career

William Morris was born in the Ocean Grove section of Neptune Township, New Jersey on March 22, 1890. After graduating from grammar school and high school he was appointed by Congressman Benjamin Franklin Howell to the United States Military Academy (USMA) at West Point, New York in 1907. He graduated from there in June 1911, alongside John P. Lucas, Frederick Gilbreath, Charles P. Hall, Joseph Cowles Mehaffey, John R. Homer, Karl Slaughter Bradford, Thompson Lawrence, Jesse A. Ladd, Gustave H. Franke, James R.N. Weaver, Paul W. Baade, Herbert Dargue, Alexander Surles, Harold F. Nichols, Raymond Albert Wheeler, Philip Bracken Fleming, Ira T. Wyche. Like Morris, all of these men would become general officers before, during, or after World War II.

After graduation he was commissioned as a second lieutenant into the Infantry Branch of the United States Army and was assigned to the 19th Infantry Regiment at Camp Jossman, Philippine Islands. He then served at Fort McKinley, afterwards transferring to the 15th Infantry Regiment with duty in Tientsin, China, where he served from 1912 to 1914.

In 1914, Morris was assigned to the 9th Infantry Regiment in Laredo, Texas, where he served until 1916. While there he married Ida Marguerite Downing, who he met soon after being commissioned in 1911. Morris was then appointed as a Reserve Officers' Training Corps (ROTC) instructor and basketball coach at Texas Agricultural and Mechanical College (now Texas A&M University), where he served until 1917, when he returned to the 9th Infantry Regiment as its S-2 intelligence officer.

Morris was promoted to captain on May 15, 1917, over a month after the American entry into World War I. Thirteen months later he was a major. In July 1918 he was sent to the Western Front and was appointed commanding officer (CO) of the 1st Battalion, 360th Infantry Regiment, part of the 90th Division of the American Expeditionary Force (AEF). He led his battalion in the Battle of Saint-Mihiel and in the Meuse–Argonne offensive. He was wounded on November 1, just ten days before the end of hostilities on November 11, 1918, an action for which he received the Distinguished Service Cross, the nation's second highest award for valor in the face of the enemy, and the Purple Heart. He remained in Europe with the Army of occupation, commanding his battalion in Germany, and then serving on the staffs of the (AEF) General Headquarters (GHQ) and the IX Corps.

Between the wars
After the war Morris returned to the United States in June 1919 as a ROTC instructor at Bucknell University, Pennsylvania, where he was a Professor of Military Science and Tactics. After that he served with the 10th Infantry Regiment at Fort Hayes, Ohio. He entered the U.S. Army Command and General Staff School at Fort Leavenworth, Kansas in 1924, and graduated from there in 1925. After he graduated he served as a staff officer with the HQ of the 8th Coast Artillery Regiment, then stationed at Fort Sam Houston, Texas. In 1929 he entered the U.S. Army War College at Washington, D.C. and graduated the following year. He remained there for the next three years as an instructor.
 
In 1937, he served with, and later commanded, the 2nd Battalion, 66th Infantry Regiment at Fort Benning, Georgia. From 1938 to 1940 Morris served as a G-1 staff officer on the General Staff of the War Department in Washington, D.C. By late 1940 he was commander of the 66th Armored Regiment.

World War II
In February 1942, two months after the United States entered World War II, Morris, by now promoted to the one-star general officer rank of brigadier general, raised the 6th Armored Division as its first Commanding General (CG). He was promoted to the two-star rank of major general fifteen months later, in May 1943. In 1943 he was CG of the II Armored Corps. He was sent to Italy as a Ground Force Observer for the Salerno landings in September 1943. He returned to the United States and became CG of the XVIII Corps.

Upon hearing of the death of Major General Paul Newgarden, CG of the 10th Armored Division, who died in a plane accident, in July 1944, he contacted General George C. Marshall, the U.S. Army Chief of Staff, and requested demotion to command of the 10th Armored Division, then preparing for transfer to the European Theater of Operations (ETO).

His request was granted and he led the division overseas on the Western Front, where it played a played a vital role in the relief of Bastogne during the Battle of the Bulge, the largest battle fought by the American Army during World War II. Following this he was assigned to command VI Corps in Lieutenant General Alexander Patch's U.S. Seventh Army in the U.S. Sixth Army Group, under Lieutenant General Jacob L. Devers, which drove from the Rhine to Italy in the spring of 1945. The 411th Infantry Regiment of the 103rd Infantry Division linked up there at Vipiteno on May 4 with troops of the 349th Infantry Regiment of the 88th Infantry Division of the Fifth Army, joining the Central European and Mediterranean theatres.

Postwar

After the war, from 1945 to 1948, Morris served on the War Department Personnel Board in Washington, D.C.

In 1949, he was assigned as head of the U.S. Caribbean Command as a lieutenant general, where he remained until his 1952 retirement from the army.

Morris died on March 30, 1971 in Washington, D.C.. He is buried in Arlington National Cemetery, Virginia, Section 5, Grave 47.

Awards and decorations
William Morris's awards and decorations included the Distinguished Service Cross, Army Distinguished Service Medal, Silver Star, Legion of Merit, Bronze Star and Purple Heart.

Citation for Distinguished Service Cross
For extraordinary heroism in action near Villers-devant-Dun, France, November 1, 1918. During darkness he led his battalion in an attack under heavy artillery and machine-gun fire. Upon reaching a hill he exposed himself to heavy fire to reconnoiter personally the enemy position, and then, although wounded by a machine-gun bullet, heroically led his battalion in their advance, refusing to be evacuated, inspiring his men by his personal courage.

Name: Morris, William H.H. Jr. Rank: Major, U.S. Army Organization: 360th Infantry Regiment, 90th Division, A.E.F. Date of Action: November 1, 1918 Order: General Orders 87, War Department, 1919 Home Town: Ocean Grove, New Jersey

References

Further reading
 Biographical Register of the Officers and Graduates of the U.S. Military Academy, by George W. Cullum, edited by Wirt Robinson, 1920, page 1549
 The Congressional Medal of Honor, the Distinguished Service Cross and the Distinguished Service Medal Issued by the War Department since April 6, 1917, up to and Including General Orders, No. 126, War Department, November 11, 1919, published by the U.S. Army Adjutant General's Office, 1919, page 418
 Who Was Who in America: With World Notables, published by Marquis Who's Who, LLC, 1973, page 513
 Annual Report of the General Service Schools, 1924–1925, page 12,
 Army List and Directory, published by U.S. Army Adjutant General's Office, 1937, page 284
 Hitler's Last Gamble: the Battle of the Bulge, December 1944-January 1945, Trevor Nevitt Dupuy, David L. Bongard, Richard Claire Anderson, 1994, page 200
 Military Times, Hall of Valor, List of Recipients, Distinguished Service Medal
 "Gen. Mark Clark to Command Field Forces; Wedemeyer Will Succeed Him at Presidio", The New York Times, August 25, 1949
 "Caribbean Commander to Quit", The New York Times, February 7, 1952
 Official Army Register, published by U.S. Army Adjutant General's Office, 1946
 U.S. Army Register, published by U.S. Army Adjutant General's Office, 1964
Growl of the Tiger: 10th Armored Tiger Division. 1995. Dean M. Chapman. (Memoir of author's role as Gen. Morris' aide during World War II.)
 A Tiger's Tale Of a Born Loser.  2003.  Ralph Spencer.  (Memoir of author's service in 10th Armored Division during World War II.)

External links
Generals of World War II
United States Army Officers 1939–1945

|-

|-

|-

1971 deaths
1890 births
United States Army Infantry Branch personnel
United States Army War College faculty
People from Neptune Township, New Jersey
United States Military Academy alumni
United States Army Command and General Staff College alumni
United States Army generals
Recipients of the Legion of Merit
Recipients of the Silver Star
Recipients of the Distinguished Service Medal (US Army)
Recipients of the Distinguished Service Cross (United States)
United States Army War College alumni
Burials at Arlington National Cemetery
United States Army personnel of World War I
United States Army generals of World War II
Military personnel from New Jersey